Shearjashub Bourne (June 14, 1746 – March 11, 1806) was an American lawyer, jurist, and politician from Massachusetts who served in the Massachusetts House of Representatives and United States House of Representatives.

Bourne was born in Barnstable in the Province of Massachusetts Bay on June 14, 1746, the son of Timothy and Elizabeth Bourne.

He graduated from Harvard University in 1764, studied law and became an attorney in Barnstable.  He served in local office including justice of the peace.  Among the individuals who studied law with him and later embarked on their own legal careers was Lot Hall, who served as a Justice of the Vermont Supreme Court.

From 1782 to 1785 and 1788 to 1790 he served in the Massachusetts House of Representatives.  He was also a delegate to the Massachusetts convention which ratified the U.S. Constitution.

Bourne represented Massachusetts in the United States House of Representatives from March 4, 1791, to March 3, 1795. He later served as Chief Justice of the Suffolk County, Massachusetts Court of Common Pleas.  He died in Boston on March 11, 1806.

References

External links
Letter from Shearjashub Bourne To George Washington

 

1746 births
1806 deaths
Harvard College alumni
Members of the Massachusetts House of Representatives
Members of the United States House of Representatives from Massachusetts
People from colonial Boston
Massachusetts lawyers
People from Barnstable, Massachusetts
People of colonial Massachusetts